Ian McColl, Baron McColl of Dulwich,  (born 6 January 1933) is a British surgeon, professor, politician and Conservative member of the House of Lords. McColl was made a life peer for his work for disabled people in the Queen's Birthday Honours in 1989, which was gazetted on 29 July 1989 with the style and title of Baron McColl of Dulwich, of Bermondsey in the London Borough of Southwark. He was Parliamentary Private Secretary to Prime Minister John Major (of which he served concurrently with John Ward MP) from 1994 to 1997 for which he was appointed a Commander of the Order of the British Empire (CBE) in 1997.

From 1997 to 2000, he was a Shadow Minister for Health. He is also a trustee and surgeon to the international charity Mercy Ships.

McColl was educated at Hutchesons' Grammar School, Glasgow, and St. Paul's School, London.  He studied medicine at the University of London and was Professor of surgery at Guy's Hospital until 1998. He is a Fellow of King's College London, where he continues to teach on the Guy's Campus.

Legislative proposals
In June 2015, he introduced a private member's bill to prohibit the advertising of prostitution, the Advertising of Prostitution (Prohibition) Bill 2015–16.

On 26 June 2017, he introduced the Modern Slavery (Victim Support) Bill, a private member's bill to "make provision about identifying and supporting victims of modern slavery". The Bill completed its House of Lords stages on 10 May 2018 and was presented to the House of Commons on 18 May 2018. The Bill would amend the period of assistance and support offered to victims with a conclusive grounds status to 12 months after a 45-day period of "reflection and recovery" ends. The same Bill was re-introduced for a First Reading in the House of Lords on 13 January 2020, and, as of 27 October 2022, is in the Second Reading in the House of Lords.

References

1933 births
Academics of King's College London
Alumni of the University of London
Commanders of the Order of the British Empire
Conservative Party (UK) life peers
Fellows of King's College London
Living people
People educated at Hutchesons' Grammar School
People educated at St Paul's School, London
Life peers created by Elizabeth II